The women's 400 metres event at the 2013 European Athletics Indoor Championships was held on March 1, 2013 at 11:00 (round 1), March 2, 16:35 (semi-final) and March 3, 11:15 (final) local time.

Records

Results

Round 1
Qualification: First 2 (Q) and the 4 fastest athletes (q) advanced to the semifinals.

Semifinals
Qualification: First 3 (Q) advanced to the final.

Final
The final was held at 11:15.

References

400 metres at the European Athletics Indoor Championships
2013 European Athletics Indoor Championships
2013 in women's athletics